Kuttichathan is a demon in Malabar demonology.

Kuttichathan or Kuttichaathan may also refer to:
 Kuttichaathan (film), a 1975 Indian Malayalam film
 My Dear Kuttichathan, India's first 3D film, a 1984 Indian Malayalam fantasy film also released under the title Kuttichathan
 Hello Kuttichathan (2008) and Hello Kuttichathan 2 (2009), programs broadcast by Asianet
 Kuttichathan Theyyam, a theyyam performed in North Kerala, India